Nipaniya is a village in Beohari Tehsil in Shahdol District of Madhya Pradesh State, India. It belongs to Shahdol Division. It is located 95 km north of the district headquarters of Shahdol, 31 km from Beohari Tehsil and 454 km from the State capital, Bhopal.

Geography 
Nipaniya is located at 24° 12′ 0″ N, 79° 14′ 0″ E. It is divided into three Zones as per the Department of Land record and revenue of mp as Nipaniya 339,  Nipaniya 340 Nipaniya 341 .

It has an average elevation of 361.560m above mean sea level. It is 3.72 km distant on north 11 km on west  from the neareast Bansagar reservoir water. In a broad way it is surrounded by bansagar reservoir at an average radius of 6.5 km in north, west, and north- south but is at a very safe margin of 19.92m above FRL of Bansagar Reservoir. The terrain at the village is undulated but has a pattern of a hill i.e. highest at the center of village and continuously decreasing radially towards border. Because of this terrain pattern most of its border areas are suitable for agriculture which are supposed to be irrigated by the small narrow non-perennial channels.

Demographics 
As of 2011 India census the following details are conforming to the village of Nipaniya:

Agriculture 

Agriculture is counted as the chief economic occupation of the population. Rice and wheat farming has become one of the most harvested crops in Nipaniya due to a balanced temperature and the soil of the field which is loose, friable and deep.

The main crops are paddy, cereals like maize, sorghum, kodo-kutki and other small millet, pulses like tuar and udhad and oil seeds like til, groundnut, soya-bean and sunflowers are also grown.

Being hilly and plain rolling mixed terrain, canal irrigation facility is mostly unavailable in the village. Until 2000 the most farmers were dependent on tropical rainfall but currently most of the farmers have made their field irrigated by mechanical means like tube wells, diesel pumps and open wells.

Forest 
Palas tree, Mango tree, Vachellia nilotica,  Neem, and Mahua are the main trees found in the village. The nearest forest area of Murchour is touched by Bnadhavgadh National Park.

Education

College 
Nipaniya village has an IGNOU open college.

School 
 Government Higher secondary school
 Government Girls school Nipaniya
 Sarswati Shishu Mandir Nipaniya
 Government Middle School
 3 Government Primary Schools

Telecom facility 
Following services by BSNL (2G), Airtel, Reliance GSM & CDMA, Tata Docomo, Virgin Mobile, Idea (3G), Vodafone, videocon and is available at Nipaniya.

Connectivity

Road transport 
Nipaniya is connected by All weather Major District Road to Beohari which in turn connects to Rewa Satna, Shahdol, Sidhi and Umaria.

Railways 
Nearest railway station is VIJAYSOTA (VST) and there are direct trains to Jabalpur Katni Sagar Singrauli. VST is an important station between Katni -Singrauli route.

References 

Villages in Shahdol district